The discography of Romanian all-female rock band Blaxy Girls comprises two studio albums (one under production), five singles (one under production) and five music videos (one promotional).  Their debut studio album was released in December, 2008 after a year of work.  Three of their singles  - "If You Feel My Love", "Dear Mama" and "I Have My Life" - reached top 40 on Romanian Top 100, with the first two being Top 10 efforts.  They participated at 2009 Selectia Nationala with the song Dear Mama, where they finished in a tie for the second place.  In 2010 they had the intention to participate at the Selectia Nationala with Save The World, but they withdrawn the song.

Studio albums

EP

 Note: The EP was released only via iTunes, and it contains the tracks: I Have My Life, E vina Mea and Nu Suporti.

Singles

Music videos

References

Discographies of Romanian artists
Pop music group discographies